Xinjiang is a town under the administration of Yongning District, Nanning, Guangxi, China. , it has one residential community and 8 villages under its administration.

References 

Towns of Guangxi
Nanning